Dame Stella Katherine Casey  (née Wright; 22 May 1924 – 7 July 2000) was a New Zealand campaigner for social issues as well as a prominent member of various national organisations.

Early life and family
Stella Katherine Wright was born in New Plymouth on 22 May 1924, the daughter of Stella Regina Wright (née Hickey, 1887–1973), a schoolteacher prior to her wedding, and William James Wright (1883–1959). She was educated at Opunake District High School, and Sacred Heart College, Christchurch. She went on to study at Victoria University College from 1947 to 1947, graduating Bachelor of Arts in 1948.

In 1948, she married Maurice Eugene Casey, a lawyer born in 1923. The couple had either nine or ten children (sources vary).

Community activities
Casey was a member of the Catholic Women's League, the National Council of Women, the Christchurch Polytechnic Council and the New Zealand branch of the Federation of University Women. She started her first campaign in 1969 in Browns Bay on Auckland's East Coast Bays when she objected to pornography being on display in shops; this resulted in a nationwide debate.

Honours and awards
In the 1991 New Year Honours, Casey was appointed a Dame Commander of the Order of the British Empire, for services to the community. Later that year, in the Queen's Birthday Honours, her husband, by then a Court of Appeal judge, was appointed a Knight Bachelor. In 1993, Stella Casey was awarded the New Zealand Suffrage Centennial Medal.

Death
Casey died in Wellington on 7 July 2000, aged 76. Her husband died in 2012.

References

1924 births
2000 deaths
People from New Plymouth
People educated at Opunake High School
People educated at Catholic Cathedral College
Victoria University of Wellington alumni
Anti-pornography activists
New Zealand Dames Commander of the Order of the British Empire
New Zealand activists
New Zealand women activists
New Zealand people of Irish descent
New Zealand Roman Catholics
Recipients of the New Zealand Suffrage Centennial Medal 1993
Wives of knights